Points North Landing Water Aerodrome  is located adjacent to Points North Landing, Saskatchewan, Canada.

See also 
 List of airports in Saskatchewan
 Points North Landing Airport

References 

Registered aerodromes in Saskatchewan
Seaplane bases in Saskatchewan